0C (zero C) or 0-C may refer to:
0 °C, the melting point of ice on the Celsius scale
0C, or zero carbon
Zero carbon building
Zero carbon city
0 configuration networking, or zero-configuration networking, a set of techniques that automatically creates a usable Internet Protocol (IP) network
0-coupon bond, or Zero-coupon bond, a type of discount bond
0 copula, or Zero copula, a linguistic phenomenon where a subject is joined to a predicate without overt marking of this relationship
0 crossing, or Zero crossing, a point where the sign of a function crosses the zero axis
0 consonant, or Zero consonant, a consonant-like letter that is not pronounced

See also
C0 (disambiguation)
OC (disambiguation)